The Ying Tung Natatorium is a swimming venue located in the Olympic Sports Centre in Beijing, China with a seating capacity of 4,852. It was upgraded for the 2008 Summer Olympics and expanded to 44,635 square metres. It  hosted Olympic water polo matches and the swimming part of the modern pentathlon event. The renovations were complete by September 10, 2007.

It also served as the main swimming venue in the 1990 Asian Games and in the 2001 Summer Universiade.

It is named after Henry Fok Ying Tung, a businessman who left a large amount of money toward Olympics construction.

References
Beijing2008.cn profile.

External links

Sports venues in Beijing
Swimming venues in China
Venues of the 2008 Summer Olympics
Olympic modern pentathlon venues
Olympic water polo venues
Sports venues completed in 1990
Venues of the 1990 Asian Games
Asian Games diving venues
Asian Games swimming venues
Asian Games water polo venues